Jase TV was a short-lived New Zealand children's television show in which hosts Jason Gunn and puppet Thingee introduced cartoons. It aired on TVNZ in 1992  and eventually led into The Son of a Gunn Show.

Programmes
The Adventures of Spot
Anytime Tales
Brum
Charlie Chalk
Fiddley Foodle Bird
Fireman Sam
Hot Dog
Jim Henson's Mother Goose Stories
Joshua Jones
Just So Stories
King Rollo
Kitty Cats
Nellie the Elephant
Noddy's Toyland Adventures
Pete and Penny
Play School
Poddington Peas
Postman Pat
Puddle Lane
Rainbow
The Ratties
Roger Ramjet
Rupert
The Smoggies
The Sooty Show
Spider!
SuperTed
T-Bag
Thomas the Tank Engine & Friends
Topsy and Tim
Towser
Truckers
Zoo Olympics

References

External links

New Zealand children's television series
New Zealand children's animated television series
1990s New Zealand television series
1992 New Zealand television series debuts
1992 New Zealand television series endings
TVNZ original programming
New Zealand television shows featuring puppetry